25 mm may refer to:

25 mm caliber, a large caliber round, used by cannon and autocannon
25 mm grenade, an explosive round used by some grenade launchers
1 inch